The Our Lady Queen of Nigeria Pro-Cathedral, also called Abuja Cathedral, is the name given to a religious building affiliated with the Catholic Church located on the Funmilayo Kuti street in Garki in the city of Abuja the capital of the African country of Nigeria. It serves as the procathedral or temporary cathedral of Abuja and is expected to be replaced by the Cathedral of the Twelve Apostles in the same city when it is completed.

Initially it was called "Church of All Saints" and had its first priest in 1983.

The church follows the Roman Catholic or Latin rite and is the mother church of the Metropolitan Archdiocese of Abuja (Archidioecesis Abugensis), which was created as a mission sui juris in 1981 and was elevated to its current status in 1994 through the bull "Quo aptius" of the pope John Paul II.

It is under the pastoral responsibility of Archbishop Ignatius Kaigama. The cathedral was visited by Pope John Paul II in 1988 and also by the then president of Nigeria Goodluck Jonathan in 2015.

See also
Cathedral of the Holy Cross, Lagos
List of cathedrals in Nigeria
Roman Catholicism in Nigeria

References

Roman Catholic cathedrals in Nigeria
Churches in Abuja
20th-century Roman Catholic church buildings in Nigeria